Hippocampus angustus, commonly known as the narrow-bellied seahorse, western Australian seahorse, or western spiny seahorse, is a species of marine fish of the family Syngnathidae. It is found in waters off of Australia, from Perth to Hervey Bay, and the southern portion of Papua New Guinea in the Torres Strait. It is expected to feed on small crustaceans, similar to other seahorses. This species is ovoviviparous, with males carrying eggs in a brood pouch before giving birth to live young. This type of seahorse is monogamous in its mating patterns. The males only fertilize one female's eggs for the mating season because of the population distribution. While some seahorses can be polygamous because they are denser in population, this type of seahorse is more sparsely distributed and the cost of reproduction is high. Therefore, the risk to reproduce due to predatory and distributary factors limits this breed to one mate, often finding the same mate season after season.

Identification 
They can be identified by their slender body, long snout, well developed spines and high coronet. Colouration is generally grey to brownish, with white, yellow, orange or brown scribbly, net-like markings on the head and body. The snout has 5-6 distinctive dark irregular stripes.

References

Further reading 
 iSeahorse
 IUCN Seahorse, Pipefish & Stickleback Specialist Group

narrow-bellied seahors
Marine fish of Northern Australia
Taxa named by Albert Günther 
narrow-bellied seahors
Taxonomy articles created by Polbot